Jennifer J. Arroyo (born March 20, 1975 in Staten Island, New York) is an American bassist best known for her tenure in the Canadian heavy metal group Kittie.

While living in the Washington, D.C. area, she was the bassist for the rap metal band Spine.  The band released two albums, and was quite popular in the Mid-Atlantic music scene, but did not manage to go much further, eventually breaking up after releasing one national label album.

Her career in Kittie started after Talena Atfield left Kittie in 2002 without citing any official reasons. Jennifer had previously befriended the band when she was with Spine while filming a performance on the short-lived television show Farmclub.com, in Los Angeles, California. With a vacancy in the band, the remaining band members of Kittie invited Jennifer to join their band full-time.

On March 23, 2005, Morgan Lander made a post indicating that both Marx and Arroyo had left the band. Arroyo's split was amicable while Marx's was a surprise. Financial reasons were cited as well as, in the case of Arroyo, the desire to work outside of Kittie full-time.

Jennifer Arroyo is the bassist for the New York band Suicide City. She also runs her own production company, Jenncity Productions in New York City and was featured in the May 2007 issue of Revolver magazine. Arroyo was also a judge for the 8th annual Independent Music Awards. Her contributions assisted the careers of upcoming independent artists. Arroyo has agreed to continue with her contributions and is a judge for the ninth annual Independent Music Awards.

In July 2012, Arroyo became a contestant on CBS's Big Brother 14. After 67 days, she was evicted from the house, placing fifth in the competition.

Arroyo is openly lesbian.

References

External links
Suicide City's official website
Suicide City's official Myspace
Suicide City's official Pure Volume
Jenncity Productions

Living people
American heavy metal bass guitarists
American musicians of Puerto Rican descent
Women bass guitarists
Hispanic and Latino American musicians
American lesbian musicians
LGBT Hispanic and Latino American people
LGBT people from New York (state)
1975 births
Big Brother (American TV series) contestants
Guitarists from New York (state)
American women guitarists
20th-century American bass guitarists
21st-century American bass guitarists
20th-century American women musicians
20th-century American musicians
21st-century American women musicians
Kittie members
Suicide City members
20th-century American LGBT people
21st-century American LGBT people
Women in metal